Nyctimeniini is a tribe of longhorn beetles of the subfamily Lamiinae. It was described by Gressitt in 1951. It contains the single genus Nyctimenius.

Taxonomy
 Nyctimenius chiangi Huang, Liu & Chen, 2014
 Nyctimenius mamutensis (Hayashi, 1975)
 Nyctimenius ochraceovittatus (Aurivillius, 1922)
 Nyctimenius palawanicus (Aurivillius, 1922)
 Nyctimenius sabahensis (Hayashi, 1975)
 Nyctimenius subsericeus (Pascoe, 1866)
 Nyctimenius tristis (Fabricius, 1792)
 Nyctimenius varicornis (Fabricius, 1801)

References

Lamiinae